Cai Lixin (born October 1971) is a Chinese politician, currently serving as executive vice chairwoman of Guangxi.

Cai is a representative of the 20th National Congress of the Chinese Communist Party and an alternate member of the 20th Central Committee of the Chinese Communist Party. Cai is a delegate to the 13th National People's Congress.

Early life and education
Cai was born in Wuxi County (now Wuxi), Jiangsu, in October 1971. In 1990, she entered Soochow University, where she majored in Ideological and political education. She joined the Chinese Communist Party (CCP) in October 1992, when she was a junior student. She also received a master's degree in management and a doctor's degree in law from Soochow University in December 2001 and June 2006, respectively.

Political career
Cai worked in government of Pingjiang District after university in 1994. In November 1995, she became deputy secretary of Pingjiang District Committee of the Communist Youth League of China, rising to secretary the next year. She served as deputy secretary of Suzhou Municipal Committee of the Communist Youth League of China in November 1997, and five years later promoted to the secretary position. In June 2006, she was named acting governor of Pingjiang District, confirmed in the following year. She was appointed head of the Publicity Department of the CCP Suzhou Municipal Committee in September 2011 and was admitted to member of the Standing Committee of the CCP Suzhou Municipal Committee, the city's top authority. She was appointed director of Jiangsu Provincial Network Information Office in June 2015, concurrently serving as deputy head of the Publicity Department of the CCP Jiangsu Provincial Committee. In October 2016, she was appointed head of the Publicity Department of the CCP Nanjing Municipal Committee and was admitted to member of the Standing Committee of the CCP Nanjing Municipal Committee, the capital city's top authority. She served as mayor of Huai'an from January 2018 to December 2019, and party secretary, the top political position in the city, from December 2019 to February 2021. She also served as chairwoman of Huai'an Municipal People's Congress.

In February 2021, Cai was transferred to southwest China' Guangxi Zhuang Autonomous Region and appointed vice chairwoman. She is also a member of the Standing Committee of the CCP Guangxi Zhuang Autonomous Regional Committee, the region's top authority.

References

1971 births
Living people
People from Wuxi
Soochow University (Suzhou) alumni
People's Republic of China politicians from Jiangsu
Chinese Communist Party politicians from Jiangsu
Alternate members of the 20th Central Committee of the Chinese Communist Party
Delegates to the 13th National People's Congress